KYOO is a radio station airing a country music format, simulcasting KYOO-FM 99.1 Halfway, Missouri. The station is licensed to Bolivar, Missouri, broadcasting on 1200 kHz AM. The station is owned by Dennis Benne, through licensee Benne Broadcasting of Bolivar, LLC.

Previous logo

References

External links

Country radio stations in the United States
YOO
Radio stations established in 1961
1961 establishments in Missouri
YOO (AM)